Mark Richard Benson (born 6 July 1958) is an English former cricketer and umpire. Benson played for England in one Test match and one One Day International in 1986. He later took up umpiring and spent time on the Elite Panel of ICC Umpires.

Early life
Benson was born in Shoreham-by-Sea, West Sussex, England. He was educated at Sutton Valence school in Kent and worked for a time as a marketing assistant for Shell. He then took up full-time cricket with Kent.

Playing career
Benson made his first-class debut as a left-handed opening batsman in 1980 and was virtually an "ever-present" in the Kent side for the next fifteen seasons scoring over 18,000 runs (48 centuries) for the county. He was Kent's third highest aggregate run scorer in the post-war era and his batting average of 40.27 was the fourth highest for a major batsman in Kent's history (after Les Ames, Frank Woolley and Colin Cowdrey). He scored 1,000 runs in a season 12 times, with a best of 1,725 runs (average 44.23) in 1987. Benson played 268 One Day matches (5 centuries, 53 fifties, 6 "man of the match" awards) for Kent scoring 7814 runs at an average of 31.89. These included a man of the match-winning century as Kent won a NatWest Trophy semi final in 1984, although they lost in the final to Middlesex.

For the 1991 Benson was appointed captain of Kent and on his first day as captain he scored a career best 257 against Hampshire. Under his captaincy Kent were runners-up in the County Championship in 1992, Sunday League champions in 1995 (runners up in 1993) and Benson & Hedges Cup finalists in 1992 and 1995. At the end of the 1995 season Benson was forced to retire due to a knee injury.

In 1986 Benson played one Test Match for England against India and one ODI against New Zealand. He was initially called up as a replacement after an injury to Wayne Larkins. He was plunged into a crisis at the start of his only Test match, being at the wicket as England lost two wickets without a run on the board, but helped England to a draw, ending a run of seven successive Test defeats. In 1993 Benson captained an England XI in two limited-over matches against the Netherlands, top-scoring for his side in both matches with 61 and 58, his team winning the first match, and losing the second. These matches however were not one-day internationals.

Overall, Benson scored a century every 10.23 innings, the third highest rate for Kent, including a century in each innings v Warwickshire in 1993. Benson and Neil Taylor scored the highest opening partnership (300) for Kent v Derbyshire in 1991. Brian Luckhurst named Benson as Kent's greatest post war opening batsmen and referred to him as "His generation's unsung hero."

Umpiring career
After retiring from playing Benson became an umpire, making his first-class umpiring debut in 1997 and standing in international matches for the first time in 2004. He stood in eight matches in the 2007 Cricket World Cup. In September 2007 he was nominated for the ICC Umpire of the Year Award after just one full season on the panel.

In April 2006, having stood in eight Tests and twenty-four one-day internationals, Benson became one of three umpires promoted from the Emirates International Panel of Umpires to the Emirates Elite Panel of Umpires. He also stood in the 2007 World Twenty 20 final in Johannesburg, South Africa.

Whilst umpiring the second Test between South Africa and India at Durban on 28 December 2006 Benson had to leave the field, after suffering from heart palpitations.

Later in 2008, Benson made history in the 1st Test in Sri Lanka, being the first umpire to be asked to refer a decision. When Tillakaratne Dilshan asked for the umpire Mark Benson's decision to give him out caught behind to be reviewed, the English official changed his verdict when the television replay umpire Rudi Koertzen could not say conclusively that the ball had hit his bat or the ground on the way through to the Indian wicketkeeper.

Benson withdrew in the middle of the second Test match in November 2009 between Australia and the West Indies, amid speculation that he was upset with the referral system when one of his decisions was overturned. The ICC denied this, saying that Benson was ill.

On 5 February 2010 it was announced that Benson was retiring from international cricket umpiring, but would continue to umpire domestic cricket in England. In January 2016 he retired as an umpire.

See also
 One Test Wonder
 List of Test cricket umpires
 List of One Day International cricket umpires
 List of Twenty20 International cricket umpires

References

External links
 
 Benson, Doctrove and Rauf elevated to Elite Panel from Cricinfo

1958 births
Living people
People from Shoreham-by-Sea
English cricketers
England Test cricketers
England One Day International cricketers
Kent cricketers
Kent cricket captains
English Test cricket umpires
English One Day International cricket umpires
English Twenty20 International cricket umpires
Marylebone Cricket Club cricketers